The Congressional Hispanic Leadership Institute (CHLI) is a 501(c)3 non-profit and non-partisan organization founded by Members of Congress to advance the Hispanic Community's Economic Progress with a focus on Social Responsibility and Global Competitiveness.

The CHLI's purpose is to foster a broad awareness of the diversity of thought, heritage, interests and views of Americans of Hispanic and Portuguese descent.

It was founded in 2003.

References

Non-profit organizations based in Washington, D.C.
Ethnic studies organizations
Political advocacy groups in the United States